Greg Youngblood is an American football coach.  He is the defensive coordinator and lineman coach at Olivet Nazarene University,  a position he had held since 2016.  Youngblood served as the head football coach at Waldorf College in Forest City, Iowa from 2007 until 2011 and at Dordt College in Sioux Center, Iowa from 2012 to 2015.

Head coaching record

References

Year of birth missing (living people)
Living people
American football safeties
Bates Bobcats football coaches
Bates Bobcats football players
Dordt Defenders football coaches
Olivet Nazarene Tigers football coaches
Taylor Trojans football coaches
Waldorf Warriors football coaches
High school football coaches in Connecticut
University of New Mexico alumni
High school football coaches in New Mexico